Phricanthes petulans is a species of moth of the family Tortricidae. It is found in India in the state of Assam and in Indonesia on the island of Java.

References

Moths described in 1912
Phricanthini